Transition is the seventh studio album of John Miles in 1985, credited to the John Miles Band. In early 1984, Miles began to work on songs for his next album and went on tour to promote his current album Play On. In late spring 1984, Miles and Marshall wrote more songs from the album while their manager was looking for a new record label.

Some time later, while he was performing in a residence in Ibiza, Miles met Phil Carson, who was an executive from Atlantic Records. He signed Miles to a new record label, Valentino.
Miles and Marshall started to work with producer Trevor Rabin. Rabin, who had other commitments, only produced two tracks for them ("Blinded" and "I Need Your Love"). Miles did not want another long delay like with the previous album, he continued recording with engineer Pat Moran (who produced all other tracks except "Watching on Me" which was produced by Beau Hill) in Wales. "Blinded" and "I Need Your Love" were released as singles, but both failed to chart in the U.K, just like the album.

Track listing
All songs written by Marshall/Miles

"Once in Your Life" – 3:56
"Run" – 3:46
"Blinded" – 6:29
"You're the One" – 4:32
"I Need Your Love" – 4:56
"Hard Time" – 4:13
"Who Knows" – 3:56
"Don't Lie to Me" – 4:24
"Watching over Me" – 3:53

Personnel

Band members
John Miles - lead vocals, guitar, keyboards
Bob Marshall - bass
Barriemore Barlow - drums, percussion, backing vocals

Production
Pat Moran – producer, engineer, re-mixing
Trevor Rabin – producer on tracks 3, 5
Beau Hill – producer on track 9
Steve Benson, Paul DeVillea – engineers
Phil Vinall – mixing

References

1985 albums
John Miles (musician) albums
Albums produced by Trevor Rabin
Albums produced by Beau Hill
Albums produced by Pat Moran